10th World Soundtrack Awards
October 23, 2010

Best Original Soundtrack:
Fantastic Mr. Fox

The 10th World Soundtrack Awards were given out on 23 October 2010 in Ghent, Belgium.

Awards

World Soundtrack of the Year
Fantastic Mr. Fox by Alexandre Desplat
Avatar by James Horner
Where the Wild Things Are by Carter Burwell
A Single Man by Abel Korzeniowski
Sherlock Holmes by Hans Zimmer

Soundtrack Composer of the Year
Alexandre Desplat for Fantastic Mr. Fox, The Twilight Saga: New Moon, Julie & Julia, and The Ghost Writer
Carter Burwell for Where the Wild Things Are, A Serious Man, The Kids Are All Right, The Blind Side, and Howl
John Powell for Green Zone, How to Train Your Dragon, Knight and Day, and Ice Age: Dawn of the Dinosaurs
Danny Elfman for The Wolfman and Alice in Wonderland
Hans Zimmer for It's Complicated and Sherlock Holmes

Best Original Song
T-Bone Burnett (lyrics), Ryan Bingham (music/lyrics/performer) for "The Weary Kind" in Crazy Heart
Anika Noni Rose (performer), Randy Newman (music/lyrics) for "Almost There" in The Princess and the Frog
Jon Thor Birgisson for "Sticks and Stones" in How to Train Your Dragon
Kuk Harrell (lyrics), Simon Franglen (music/lyrics), Leona Lewis (performer), James Horner (music/lyrics) for "I See You" in Avatar
Paul McCartney for "(I Want to) Come Home" in Everybody's Fine

Discovery of the Year
A Single Man by Abel Korzeniowski
The Book of Eli by Atticus Ross
Skin by Hélène Muddiman
District 9 by Clinton Shorter
The Last Station by Sergei Yevtushenko

Public Choice Award
A Single Man by Abel Korzeniowski

SABAM Award for Best Young European Composer
Karzan Mahmood

Lifetime Achievement Award
John Barry

External links

10th World Soundtrack Awards

2010
2010 film awards
2010 music awards